Willin' is the third studio album released by American country music singer Jon Randall. It was released in 1999 via the independent Eminent label. Randall wrote or co-wrote ten of the eleven songs on the album and produced it, the sole exception being the title track. No singles were released from it.

Track listing
All songs written by Jon Randall except where noted.
"Baby Make the Sun Go Down" (Jon Randall, Mark Winchester) – 2:58
"Can't Find the Words" – 3:32
"Willin'" (Lowell George) – 3:45
"Can't Hurt Anymore" – 4:32
"Mountain of Regret" – 3:51
"Afraid of the Dark" – 5:07
"Sweet Loretta" – 3:57
"Blew Me Away" – 3:38
"Walk the Line" – 3:50
"Breakin' the Rules" – 4:05
"Lonely Street" – 5:26

Personnel
Larry Atamanuik – drums
Tom Britt – slide guitar
Sam Bush – mandolin, background vocals
Steve Conn – accordion Hammond B-3 organ, Wurlitzer electric piano
John Cowan – bass guitar, background vocals
Jerry Douglas – Dobro, lap steel guitar
Emmylou Harris – background vocals
Monty Hitchcock – tambourine
Roy Huskey, Jr. – upright bass
Richard McLaurin – electric guitar, Hammond B-3 organ, shaker
Lorrie Morgan – background vocals
Tim O'Brien – background vocals
Al Perkins – lap steel guitar
Dave Pomeroy – bass guitar
Jon Randall – acoustic guitar, 12-string guitar, electric guitar, percussion, vocals
Kim Richey – background vocals
Randy Stewart – acoustic guitar, background vocals
Harry Stinson – drums, percussion, background vocals
Brent Truitt – acoustic guitar, electric guitar, percussion, papoose, mandolin
Kenny Vaughan – electric guitar
Scott Vestal – banjo

References

1999 albums
Jon Randall albums